Zarnowiecki is a surname. Notable people with the surname include:

Anita Zarnowiecki (born 1954), Swedish swimmer
Bernt Zarnowiecki (born 1954), Swedish swimmer, twin brother of Anita
Zbigniew Żarnowiecki (born 1927), Polish rower